"This Is Mine" is a song by the British new wave and synth-pop band Heaven 17, which was released in 1984 as the second single from their third studio album How Men Are. It was written by Glenn Gregory, Ian Craig Marsh and Martyn Ware, and produced by Marsh and Greg Walsh. The song reached No. 23 in the UK, remaining in the charts for seven weeks. It would be the band's last Top 30 single until 1992's "Temptation (Brothers In Rhythm Remix)"

Music video
The accompanying music video for the track featured Gregory, Ware and Marsh plotting and robbing a bank. The video was filmed in Exmouth Market in London. The bank building that featured in the video is now a Caffe Nero coffee shop. The video ends with the trio throwing cash from a helicopter over London.

Critical reception
On its release, DJ Mark Hollis, writing for the Daily Mirror, praised "This Is Mine" as the band's "best single so far" and noted the "brass sound is tremendous". He predicted the song would reach the UK top five. Frank Edmonds of the Bury Free Press gave it a 9 out of 10 rating and wrote, "This is an excellent piece of catchy pop. Bright and breezy brass, blaring trumpets and a superb melody make this one not to miss." Paul Benbow of the Reading Evening Post described it as "brassy but a bit slow", and considered it a return to the sound of the band's 1981 debut album Penthouse and Pavement.

Formats
7-inch single
"This Is Mine" - 3:20
"Skin" - 3:40

12-inch single
"This Is Mine" (Filmix) - 7:18
"This Is Mine" (Cinemix) - 8:55
"Skin" - 3:40

12-inch single (UK release)
"This Is Mine" (Extended version) - 5:39
"Skin" - 3:39
"Mine" - 5:04

12-inch single (US promo)
"This Is Mine" (Filmix) - 7:18
"This Is Mine" (Radio version) - 3:20
"This Is Mine" (Cinemix) - 7:25

Personnel
Heaven 17
 Glenn Gregory - lead vocals, backing vocals
 Martyn Ware - synthesizer (Roland System 100 Bass), backing vocals, LinnDrum programming, producer
 Ian Craig Marsh - synthesizer (Fairlight, Roland System 100)

Additional personnel
 Greg Walsh - synthesizer (Roland System 100 Bass), Fairlight programming, producer
 Don Myrick - saxophone (tenor solo)
 Michael Harris - flugelhorn
 The Phenix Horns - horns
 Mike Prior - photography

Charts

References

1984 songs
1984 singles
Heaven 17 songs
Songs written by Martyn Ware
Songs written by Glenn Gregory
Songs written by Ian Craig Marsh
Virgin Records singles
Arista Records singles